Ashley Chastain is an American, former collegiate softball pitcher and current head coach at Charlotte. She played college softball and was a pitcher for South Carolina.

Playing career
Chastain played college softball at South Carolina for three seasons and finished eleventh in career relief appearances for the Gamecocks. She led the team in starts, innings pitched and ERA during her junior season.

Coaching career

College of Charleston
On October 22, 2013, Chastain was named assistant coach for the College of Charleston softball program.

Michigan State
On July 20, 2016, Chastain was named the new pitching coach for the Michigan State Spartans softball program.

Ole Miss
On November 1, 2017, Chastain was named the new pitching coach for the Ole Miss Rebels softball program.

Charlotte
On June 6, 2019, Chastain was named the new head coach for the Charlotte 49ers softball program. After leading the team to a 14-13 record in 2020 before the season was cut short due to COVID-19, the 49ers went 31-19 in 2021 (their highest win total since 2016) and won their first-ever Conference USA East Division title.

Ahead of the 2022 season, Charlotte for the first time was picked as preseason favorites to win the Conference USA regular-season title. On March 2, 2022, the 49ers defeated their highest-ranked opponent in program history, upsetting No. 6 Virginia Tech 5-2.

Head coaching record

References

Year of birth missing (living people)
Living people
People from Palmetto, Georgia
Sportspeople from Fulton County, Georgia
Softball players from Georgia (U.S. state)
South Carolina Gamecocks softball players
American softball coaches
Female sports coaches
South Carolina Gamecocks softball coaches
Germany women's national softball team coaches
College of Charleston Cougars softball coaches
Michigan State Spartans softball coaches
Ole Miss Rebels softball coaches
Charlotte 49ers softball coaches